The canton of Avignon-3 is an administrative division of the Vaucluse department, in southeastern France. It was created at the French canton reorganisation which came into effect in March 2015. Its seat is in Avignon.

It consists of the following communes: 
Avignon (partly)
Morières-lès-Avignon

References

Cantons of Vaucluse